A voting system (or electoral system) is a set of rules that determine how elections and referendums are conducted and how their results are determined.

Some voting systems elect a single winner (single candidate or option), while others elect multiple winners, such as members of parliament or boards of directors.

The study of formally defined electoral methods is called social choice theory or voting theory, and this study can take place within the field of political science, economics, or mathematics, and specifically within the subfields of game theory and mechanism design.

List of voting systems by types

Key 

 Name (abbr.) and other names of the system (other names that may sometimes refer to other systems)
 Type of representation: the most common division of electoral systems
 Majoritarian: winner-takes-all systems (including all single-winner systems)
 Proportional
 Semi-proportional
 Other: sortition, etc.
 Mixed system (yes/no)
 Single-winner/multiple winner system
 List / candidate (personal election) based system
 Decision rule
 Plurality (candidates with most votes win)
 Majority (candidates must receive support at least half of voters)
 Quota (candidates must at least reach the quota)
 Type of ballot
 single choice
 multiple choice
 cumulative (more than one vote for one candidate possible)
 ranked (ordinal voting)
 score (cardinal voting)
 Number of votes/voter
 Number of tiers: number of levels e.g. local, regional, state, national

Systems

List of electoral systems used for national elections

See also 
 Comparison of electoral systems
 Sortition
 Indirect voting
 Liquid democracy

References 

Electoral systems
Electoral systems by outcome type
Electoral systems by ballot type